Bumstead Records was a small record label in Edmonton, Alberta, founded by Larry Wanagas in 1979 and run primarily out of the Edmonton recording studio Homestead Recorders.  Wanagas launched k.d. lang's career and continued for 15 years as her label and management company, with many tours, multi-platinum sales, accolades and awards.

Bumstead's management arm, Bumstead Productions Ltd. represented a number of successful artists including Susan Aglukark, Big Sugar, The Blue Shadows (featuring Billy Cowsill), BOY, Erasure (North America), Colin James, Emma-Lee, Madeleine Peyroux, The Modern Minds (featuring Moe Berg), Staggered Crossing, John Ford, Peter Elkas, The East Pointers, Tim Chaisson, Two Hours Traffic, The Lazys, Poor Young Things, Yukon Blonde and The Trews.

Wanagas, who co-founded the Alberta Recording Industry Association and was presented with the Lifetime Achievement Award by the Music Managers Forum in 2012, announced his retirement in 2017.

Discography
The Modern Minds - Theresa's World, 1980
k.d. lang - Friday Dance Promenade, 1983
k.d. lang and The Reclines - Live Tape-Cover Songs, 1984
k.d. lang and The Reclines - A Truly Western Experience, 1984, 1986, 1991, 2010
Colin James – Hook, Line And Single ("Five Long Years" / "Why'd You Lie"?), 1986
k.d. lang and The Reclines  - K.d. Lang And The Reclines With The Edmonton Symphony Nov 9/85, 1987
Glen Stace - Buddhahotel, 1991
Glen Stace - Three To Get Ready...Four To Go, 1991
Glen Stace - Road To Damascus, 1992
Monarch Brothers - Superstar, 1999
The Trews - The Trews, 2002
The Trews - House of Ill Fame, 2003
Boy - Boy, 2003
The Trews - Every Inambition, 2004
Rocketface - Rocketface, 2005
The Trews - Den Of Thieves, 2007
The Trews - Out of the Past, Into the Dark, 2007
Two Hours Traffic - Little Jabs, 2007
The Trews - No Time For Later, 2008
The Trews - Acoustic: Friends & Total Strangers, 2009
Two Hours Traffic - Territory, 2009
The Trews - Highway Of Heroes, 2010
The Trews - Hope & Ruin, 2011
The Trews - Misery Loves Company, 2011
The Trews - Thank You and I'm Sorry, 2012
Two Hours Traffic - Siren Spell, 2012
Two Hours Traffic - Foolish Blood, 2013
The Blue Shadows - On The Floor Of Heaven, 2010 (first released by Columbia Records 1993)
Yukon Blonde - Yukon Blonde, 2010
Poor Young Things - Let It Sleep, 2011
Tim Chaisson - The Other Side, 2012
Poor Young Things - The Heart. The Head. The End., 2013

See also

 List of record labels

References

 Alberta Recording Industries Association Music Manager's Forum
 "lang's debut reissued" Sperounes, Sandra. Edmonton Journal; Edmonton, Alta. 11 Dec 2009: D.6.

External links
 Official site

Record labels established in 1979
Canadian independent record labels